The National Police of Ukraine (NPU), often simply referred to as the , is the national, and only, police service of Ukraine. It was formed on 3 July 2015, as part of the post-Euromaidan reforms launched by Ukrainian president Petro Poroshenko, to replace Ukraine's previous national police service, the Militsiya. On 7 November 2015, all the remaining militsiya were labelled "temporary acting" members of the National Police.

The agency is overseen by the Ministry of Internal Affairs.

History 
Prior to 3 July 2015, law enforcement in Ukraine was carried out directly by the Ministry of Internal Affairs as the militsiya. Plans to reform the ministry, which was widely known to be corrupt, had been advocated by various governments and parties, but these plans were never realised.

In the aftermath of the 2013–2014 Euromaidan movement and subsequent revolution, the need for reform was acknowledged by all parties. Parliamentary elections were held in October 2014, after which all five of the parties that formed the governing coalition pledged to reform the ministry and create a new national police service.

As part of the reforms, the Minister of Internal Affairs, Arsen Avakov, presented plans to reduce the number of police officers in Ukraine to 160,000 by the end of 2015. The reform plans started with the combination of the ministry's current State Auto Inspection (DAI) and the patrol service in the country's capital Kyiv in summer 2015. This new police patrol received funding from various countries. 2,000 new policemen and women, picked from 33,000 applicants, were recruited to initiate the new service in Kyiv. Officers were trained in the North American style by police officers from the United States and Canada.

Upon the launch of Kyiv's new patrol police on 4 July 2015, the militsiya ceased all patrolling but continued working at precincts and administrative offices. After that the new police patrol was rolled out across Ukraine. The organisation was formally established as the National Police on 2 September 2015. By late September 2015, 2,000 new constables were on duty in Kyiv, 800 were on duty in Kharkiv and 1,700 were on duty in the cities of Odesa and Lviv. At this point, the militsiya was 152,000 officers strong, and continued to handle most policing across Ukraine. The basic salary of the new police force (almost $400 a month) is about three times as much the basic salary of the former militsiya; an attempt to decrease corruption.

The new National Police officially replaced the old militsiya on 7 November 2015. On that day, the remaining militsiya were labelled "temporarily acting" members of the National Police. The change allowed for them to become members of the National Police after "integrity checks", but they were only eligible if they met the age criteria and went through retraining. This transition period ended on 20 October 2016. In this transition period 26% of police commanders were dismissed and 4,400 policemen and policewomen demoted and the same number of people promoted.

On 14 February 2022, the National Police was transferred to combat alert, as a response to the Russian military buildup and threat of the invasion. The National Police and its tactical unit Rapid Operational Response Unit directly participated in hostilities against the invading Russian Armed Forces at the Kyiv offensive. As the 2022 Russian invasion of Ukraine progressed, the National Police helped in the war effort by maintaining law and order in Ukrainian-controlled areas, escorting prisoners, operating checkpoints, capturing infiltrators and detaining prisoners of war. By 1 March, 17 policemen were killed, 50 injured and 2 missing in action.

In February 2023, the MIA ordered the raising of 8 new assault brigades to support the Ukrainian war effort, one of those new brigades, the Lyut Brigade, is the only one so far made up of officers, NCOs and constables of the NPU's Special Police.

Terminology 
According to Professor Oleksandr Ponomariv of the Kyiv University's Institute of Journalism, the correct Ukrainian language term for a police officer is 'politsiyant'. This is in contrast to the term 'politseysky', a loan word from the Russian language, commonly used to refer to an officer of the National Police.

Ranks are rarely used by the public when addressing police officers in Ukraine; it is more common to hear the term Pan (female - Pani - Ukrainian for mister/miss - used to refer to police officers. Qualifying terms such as 'ofitser' or 'politseiskyi' may also be used in conjunction with these forms of address.

Structure and branches 
The National Police is divided into a number of different services. Each force has internal subdivisions. This leaves the police service with a large number of specialised branches which can more specifically target certain types of crime and apply more expert knowledge in the investigation of cases relating to their area of policing. In addition to these specific groups, all police forces retain a majority of officers for the purpose of patrol duty and general law enforcement.

The police contains the following subdivisions:
Criminal Police – investigation and prevention of serious and violent crime in Ukraine
Department in the fight against drug-related crime
Department of Cyber Police – fighting against cyber crimes
Department of Economic Security
Department of Patrol Police – general law enforcement operations, traffic policing and patrol duty (includes riot police divisions)
 number of municipal administrations
Department of Police Security – Successor to the State Security Service (nothing to do with the State Security Administration)

In addition, the following special units exist:
Special Police – Tasked with keeping order in areas with special status and/or affected by natural or ecological disaster.
Rapid Operational Response Unit (KORD) – Tactical response unit, tasked with resolution of stand-off situations involving hostages and/or heavily armed suspects. Also tasked with providing a tactical support function to other divisional officers.
Pre-trial Investigative Services – Representatives of the National Investigative Bureau, Tax Authorities and Security Services, tasked with investigating crime.

Shoulder patches of the regional police subdivisions

Rank hierarchy

Officers

Junior officers

Equipment 
Officers wear a camera that is constantly monitoring their performances. The resulting videos are posted on social media and broadcast on a reality TV show.

Vehicles

Police Day 

National Police Day on 4 July is the professional holiday of the Ukrainian Police. It commemorates the suspension of law enforcement duties by the Militsiya and the establishment of the National Police of Ukraine. It also coincides with the first oath of patrol policemen on Kyiv's Sofia Square. The holiday was introduced and first celebrated on 4 August 2015 and was celebrated on that day ever since until President Petro Poroshenko, by decree on 4 April 2018, declared that the holiday should be celebrated annually on 4 July and become a national holiday.

Issues
Ukrayinska Pravda collected (from open sources) 64 crimes allegedly committed by Ukrainian police officers from 1 January 2020 until 30 May 2020. Cases ranged from extortion to rape to killings.

See also 
 Law enforcement in Ukraine
 Internal Troops of Ukraine
 National Guard of Ukraine
 Kyiv Police

References

External links 
 
 

Law enforcement agencies of Ukraine
Government agencies established in 2015
Ministry of Internal Affairs (Ukraine)
2015 in Ukraine
2015 establishments in Ukraine
Institutions with the title of National in Ukraine